Leonard Steinhorn is an author, CBS News political analyst, and professor of communication and affiliate professor of history at American University. He teaches, writes and lectures on American politics and presidential elections; the 1960s in America; baby boomers; recent American history; and race relations in the United States.

Career
Steinhorn is a Phi Beta Kappa graduate of Vassar College, where he received a bachelor's degree in history. He later received his master's degree in history from Johns Hopkins University.

For several years in the 1980s, he worked as a speechwriter, press secretary, and policy advisor for members of the United States Congress, including former House Judiciary Committee Chair Peter W. Rodino and the future House Majority Leader, Congressman Steny Hoyer. He has served as a senior executive at strategic communication and media firms as well as leading non-profit organizations, including People for the American Way.

In 1995, Steinhorn began teaching at American University in Washington, D.C. He was voted American University Faculty Member of the Year in 1999 and 2001 and he also was named Honors Professor of the Year in 2010. His courses on politics, presidential elections and recent American history have been featured on CNN, C-SPAN, NBC, FOX, USA Today, Agence France-Presse, and The Chronicle of Higher Education. From 2002 to 2004, he was president of American University's chapter of Phi Beta Kappa.

Since 2012 he has served as a political analyst for CBS News Radio, covering politics and elections, and he appears regularly on WUSA9 TV News in Washington, DC. Before that he was a political analyst for FOX-5 News in Washington, DC. He also has appeared in numerous broadcast outlets including C-SPAN, CNN, CBS News, NBC News, BBC, Al Jazeera, ARD (Germany), AFP (France), CGTN (China), and NPR. Steinhorn has appeared as an on-air expert in a number of documentaries, including CNN’s The Sixties and 1968: The Year That Changed America; Superheroes Decoded on the History Channel; and The Kennedy Files on REELZ. He also appeared in a DVD special feature on the Baby Boom generation for the final season of AMC’s Mad Men.

Since 2014 Steinhorn has lectured around the country for One Day University, giving talks on American politics, history, and the 1960s. He also has given speeches at the Clinton Library in Little Rock, The National Press Club, The Economic Club of Florida, Andrews Air Force Base, Amherst College, and Charles University in Prague, among others.

In 2010, Steinhorn founded the website PunditWire with Robert Lehrman, an adjunct professor in American University's School of Communication and former speechwriter for Al Gore. PunditWire, which ceased publication in 2017, was a news commentary site whose contributors are all current or former speechwriters from across the political spectrum.

Writing
Steinhorn wrote The Greater Generation: In Defense of the Baby Boom Legacy (2006) and co-authored By the Color of Our Skin: The Illusion of Integration and the Reality of Race (1999).

He has been published in The Washington Post, New York Times, Los Angeles Times, Politico, The Hill, Political Wire, International Herald Tribune, Baltimore Sun, Atlanta Journal-Constitution, Chicago Sun-Times, Seattle Times, Huffington Post, History News Network, Salon, BillMoyers.com, World Financial Review, among others.

Critical reception

Publishers Weekly called The Greater Generation a "powerful book" and wrote that "Steinhorn forcefully and gracefully defends his age cohort against these stereotypes in a paean to the generation that forever altered the face of American culture." Kirkus said it was "a sturdy, often convincing defense of his own Boomer generation." Salon.com wrote that Steinhorn's "unapologetic celebration of the boomer legacy is refreshing, and much of his argument is convincing," but criticized it for sentimentalizing boomers.

The New York Times called By the Color of Our Skin a “clear-headed, energetic and pointedly sarcastic book about this country's racial divisions and cultural hypocrisy."

References

External links
"Leonard Steinhorn's American University Biography"

Selected works
“The forgotten riot that explains Trump’s appeal to the white working class.” Washington Post, June 24, 2019.
“How the 1968 Democratic convention fomented today’s culture wars.” Los Angeles Times, August 28, 2018. 
“Why RFK’s assassination still matters today.” History News Network, June 5, 2018.
“How the Vietnam War Gave Us President Trump.” History News Network, November 5, 2017. [24]
“The Real Forgotten Americans.” BillMoyers.com, January 19, 2017.
“The last election of the Sixties.” Chicago Sun Times, August 4, 2016.
"Sanders and Trump: How the Political and Media Establishment Got 2016 So Wrong" BillMoyers.com,  2016 February 17.
"A Disunited United States: What the 2016 Election Says About America" "World Financial Review", 4 February 2016.
"Prejudice is a powerful force" "The Hill", 30 June 2015. 
" A Love that Lasts" "Vassar Quarterly", Winter 2014.
“50 Years Ago Congress Gave the President a Blank Check for War,” History News Network, 2014 August 3. 
"The GOP's Racial DNA.""The Hill", 6 June 2014.
“White men and their guns.” Huffington Post, February 16, 2014.
“How the GOP Became the Anti-Science Party.” Huffington Post, November 21, 2011. 
“Boomers: The Real Greatest Generation Who contributed more – the heroes of World War II or the revelers at Woodstock?” The Washington Post, February 19, 2006. 
“Scrooge’s Nightmare.” Salon, November 25, 2004

Vassar College alumni
Johns Hopkins University alumni
Living people
American University faculty and staff
1956 births